Opsilia chinensis is a species of beetle from the family Cerambycidae that is endemic to China.

References

Beetles described in 1943
Beetles of Asia
chinensis
Endemic fauna of China